Before statehood, Minnesota Territory sent a non-voting delegate to the United States House of Representatives.

List of delegates representing the district

Elimination upon statehood 
The seat was eliminated after Minnesota was admitted to the Union. Western portions of the territory fell unorganized until re-organization in the Dakota Territory in 1861.

References 
 

Territory
Former congressional districts of the United States